Rasoul Najafi (born ) is an Iranian male volleyball player. He is part of the Iran men's national volleyball team. On club level he plays for Saipa Tehran.

Career 
As a junior player he competed at the 2011 FIVB Men's Junior World Championship finishing 6th. Two years later he became with the national U23 team 5th at the 2013 FIVB Volleyball Men's U23 World Championship. With the national team he finished 5th at the 2015 Summer Universiade and competed in the 2015 FIVB Volleyball World League. With his club Saipa Tehran he played in the 2015–16 Iran Super League.

Personal 
He studied Physical Education at the Islamic Azad University in Tehran.

References

External links 
 profile at FIVB.org

1991 births
Living people
Iranian men's volleyball players
Place of birth missing (living people)